A Regional Radiocommunication Conference (RRC) is a meeting held between members of the International Telecommunication Union from one or more ITU Regions, but from the whole world. Such a meeting is normally used to put in place an agreement on use of frequencies for services such as broadcasting.

Examples

RRC ST61

An important conference was held in Stockholm from 26 May to 22 June 1961, 38 countries were part of that meeting.
 Final acts of the conference

RRC GE75
 Final acts of the conference

RRC GE89
 Final acts of the conference

RRC-04/06

The snappily-named "RRC-04/06" was a Regional Radiocommunication Conference held in two sessions between 2004 and 2006. It put in place a new agreement and frequency plan for digital broadcasting (DVB-T and T-DAB) in Bands III, and IV & V for the whole of Region 1 and Iran from Region 3.

The first session of the Conference took place from 10 May to 31 May 2004 in Geneva, Switzerland; the second session took place from 15 May to 16 June 2006, also in Geneva.

It is intended that the resulting Plan and Agreement will replace those drawn up in Stockholm in 1961, and Geneva in 1989. The achieved agreement is known as GE-06
 Summary of the first session
 Summary of the second session
 RRC-06 Allocations Database (58 MB)
 RRC-06 Allocations Display Software (211 MB)
 Final acts of the Conference

See also 
 Geneva plan 1975

External links 
 RRC ITU Page
 GE-06 Agreement, Geneva 2006

Telecommunication conferences
International Telecommunication Union